LithTech is a game engine developed by Monolith Productions and comparable with the Quake and Unreal engines. Monolith and a number of other video game developers have used LithTech as the basis for their first-person shooter games.

Monolith initially developed the engine for Microsoft before purchasing the rights to it and licensing it to other developers via subsidiary LithTech Inc. The licensing company was renamed to Touchdown Entertainment in 2003 and later absorbed into Warner Bros. Interactive Entertainment after its acquisition of Monolith.

The last version of LithTech offered for licensing was Jupiter EX, initially released in 2005, however Monolith has continued to use LithTech technology in their games, including Middle-earth: Shadow of Mordor, released in 2014.

After the release of Middle-earth: Shadow of Mordor, the studio started working on a new engine (based on LithTech technology) for larger-scale battles called "Firebird".

Versions

LithTech 1.0
Originally the LithTech engine was supposed to be called DirectEngine, as Monolith was developing it for Microsoft to be included as a 3D engine for use with Microsoft's DirectX technology. When Microsoft decided not to use the engine Monolith bought back the rights to it and continued development on their own. They changed the engine's name to Lithtech and licensed it  to other companies. In the following years, the LithTech team was split off into a separate company, LithTech Inc., which was renamed Touchdown Entertainment in March 2003.

LithTech 2.0
Starting with LithTech 2.0, LithTech Inc. began the process of creating many different versions of the engine. Monolith released their game No One Lives Forever (NOLF) featuring this version of the engine, however it was later revised to LithTech 2.2. The game received an upgrade to LithTech 2.2 in a patch release. The LithTech team then continued to improve version 2.2 for its licensees, resulting in the 2.3 and 2.4 iterations.

LithTech cooperated with RealNetworks in developing a custom version of LithTech 2.2 called RealArcade LithTech (or LithTech ESD).  Among its features it supported streaming media for in-game billboards/ads, and could be used with RealNetworks' gaming site.  At one time, RealArcade LithTech could be licensed by developers if they signed an agreement with RealNetworks.  This engine was used on an internally developed title, Tex Atomic's Big Bot Battles.

LithTech Talon
LithTech Inc. developed a different engine specifically for Monolith's title, Aliens versus Predator 2.  LithTech Talon was  based on LithTech 2.2, rather than LithTech 2.4. Because of this choice, LithTech 2.4, RealArcade LithTech, and LithTech Talon became largely incompatible with each other. However, reviewers still thought of it as inferior to Unreal or id Tech.

LithTech Talon's biggest selling point lay in its capable multiplayer support, more efficient when compared to prior versions of LithTech multiplayer that featured poor networking code. Aliens versus Predator 2 features comprehensive multiplayer gameplay utilizing these improvements.

By 2003, Talon was still being licensed.

LithTech 3.0
LithTech 3.0 was being developed concurrently with Talon, but, along with its revisions, LithTech 3.x would largely be considered an internal version of the engine. While it was sent to licensees, no games were finished on it.  The primary feature announced for LithTech 3.x was the Distributed Object System, a new system for MMORPGs and multiplayer. Unfortunately, LithTech 3.x was also plagued by a significant number of bugs and problems and all games developed with LithTech 3.x would eventually convert to the newer LithTech Jupiter or to Talon.

The unreleased Monolith game Shogo II was being developed with this iteration of the LithTech engine.

LithTech Discovery
LithTech Discovery was created with the MMORPG genre and its unique requirements in mind. Discovery improved upon the working technology from LithTech 2.2, but also included the Distributed Object System which was the centerpiece of LithTech 3.x. The only game title to be powered by LithTech Discovery was The Matrix Online by Monolith. The engine was never licensed to any other company.

LithTech Jupiter
LithTech Jupiter was a thorough overhaul of the LithTech technology, developed as an alternative to 3.x. In some ways, the original version of Jupiter was even more technologically advanced than its competitors, since it supported Shader Model 1.x and included a visualization tool, whereas at the time Unreal and Quake only supported CPU-based shaders.

A custom version of Jupiter was made especially for Monolith, for use with their Tron 2.0 game; this release was codenamed LithTech Triton. Eventually, LithTech Triton's new features were merged back into LithTech Jupiter for licensees.

LithTech Jupiter EX
As of 2005 the latest public iteration of the LithTech engine was Jupiter Extended (or Jupiter EX), which was featured in F.E.A.R. and Condemned: Criminal Origins, both developed by Monolith. Compared to its precursor Jupiter, the Extended version was driven by a new DirectX 9 renderer and other advancements, including the addition of Havok physics software for improved real-world physics simulation, dynamic per-pixel lighting, bump mapping, normal mapping, and specular highlighting. Along with Havok's character dynamics, Jupiter EX also includes the "Havok Vehicle Kit", which adds support for common vehicle behavior.

LithTech Firebird
Firebird was created with purpose of larger-scale battles and the expansion of the Nemesis system for Middle-earth: Shadow of War.

Games using LithTech
The following is a partial list of video games built with the LithTech engine, arranged by the version of LithTech used.

1.0
 Shogo: Mobile Armor Division by Monolith Productions (1998)
 Blood II: The Chosen by Monolith Productions (1998)

1.5
 TNN Outdoors Pro Hunter 2 by Monolith Productions (1999)
 KISS: Psycho Circus: The Nightmare Child by Third Law Interactive (2000)
 Might and Magic IX by New World Computing (2002)

This is also the version of the engine used in the development of the LithTech Film Producer machinima tool by Strange Company, most notably used in their short film "Ozymandius". Later development switched over to LithTech 2.0 however.

2.0 and 2.2
 No One Lives Forever by Monolith Productions (2000)
 Sanity: Aiken's Artifact by Monolith Productions (2000)
 Legends of Might and Magic by New World Computing (2001)
 Die Hard: Nakatomi Plaza by Piranha Games (2002)

ESD
 Tex Atomic's Big Bot Battles by Monolith Productions (2001)
 Super Bubble Pop by Zombie (2001)

2.4
 MTH Railking Model Railroad Simulator by IncaGold (2001)
 Global Operations by Barking Dog Studios (now known as Rockstar Vancouver) (2002)

Talon
 Aliens versus Predator 2 by Monolith Productions and Third Law Interactive (2001)
 Elite Forces: WWII - Normandy by Third Law Interactive (2001)
 Elite Forces: WWII - Iwo Jima by Third Law Interactive (2001)
 Purge by Tri-Synergy (2002)
 Might and Magic IX (a.k.a. Might and Magic IX: Writ of Fate) by New World Computing (2002)
 Western Outlaw: Wanted Dead or Alive by Jarhead Games (2002)
 Nina: Agent Chronicles by City Interactive (2003)
 CTU: Marine Sharpshooter by Jarhead Games (2003)
 Marine Sharpshooter II: Jungle Warfare by Jarhead Games (2004)
 MARCH!: Offworld Recon by Buka Entertainment (2004)

Jupiter
 No One Lives Forever 2: A Spy In H.A.R.M.'s Way by Monolith Productions (2002)
 Rubies of Eventide by Cyber Warrior (now Mnemosyne) (2002)
 Sniper: Path of Vengeance by Xicat Interactive, Inc. (2002)
 Contract J.A.C.K. by Monolith Productions (2003)
 Gods and Generals by Anivision (2003)
 Tron 2.0 (LithTech Triton) by Monolith Productions (2003)
 Mysterious Journey II: Chameleon by Detalion (2003)
 Medal of Honor: Pacific Assault by EA Los Angeles (2004)
 Mob Enforcer by Touchdown Entertainment (2004)
 Sentinel: Descendants in Time by Detalion (2004)
 World War II: Sniper - Call to Victory by Jarhead Games (2005)
 Army Rangers: Mogadishu by Jarhead Games (2005)
 Sudden Attack by GameHi (2005)
 Face of Mankind by Duplex Systems (2006)
 Terrawars: New York Invasion by Ladyluck Digital Media (2006)
 Combat Arms by Doobic Studios (2008)
 Cyclone BMX by Unknown creator (unknown year released)
 Mistmare by Arxel Tribe (2003)

Discovery
 The Matrix Online by Monolith Productions (2005)

Jupiter EX
 F.E.A.R. by Monolith Productions (2005)
 Condemned: Criminal Origins by Monolith Productions (2005)
 F.E.A.R. Extraction Point by TimeGate Studios (2006)
 F.E.A.R. Perseus Mandate by TimeGate Studios (2007)
 Condemned 2: Bloodshot by Monolith Productions (2008)
 Terrorist Takedown 2: US Navy SEALs by City Interactive (2008)
 Mortyr: Operation Thunderstorm by City Interactive (2008)
 Code of Honor 2: Conspiracy Island by City Interactive (2008)
 SAS: Secure Tomorrow by City Interactive (2008)
 Royal Marines: Commando by City Interactive (2008)
 F.E.A.R. 2: Project Origin by Monolith Productions (2009)
 Armed Forces Corp. by City Interactive (2009)
 Battlestrike: Shadow of Stalingrad aka. Battlestrike: Force of Resistance 2 by City Interactive (2009)
 Code of Honor 3: Desperate Measures by City Interactive (2009)
 Wolfschanze II by City Interactive (2009)
 Special Forces by City Interactive (2010)
 Terrorist Takedown 3 by City Interactive (2010)
 Gotham City Impostors by Monolith Productions (2012)
 District 187: Sin Streets by Netmarble (2012)
 Combat Arms: Reloaded by Doobic Studios (2017)
 Middle-earth: Shadow of Mordor by Monolith Productions (2014) (Modified Lithtech Jupiter)
 Crossfire by Smilegate (2007)

Firebird
 Middle-earth: Shadow of War by Monolith Productions (2017)

Unknown version
 Vietnam: Black Ops by Fused Software (2000)
 Vietnam 2: Special Assignment by Single Cell Software (2001)
 Crisis Team: Ambulance Driver by Antidote Entertainment (2001)
 Alcatraz: Prison Escape by Zombie Inc. (2001)
 Elite Forces: Navy SEALs by Jarhead Games (2002)
 Navy SEALs: Weapons of Mass Destruction by Jarhead Games (2003)
 Arthur's Quest: Battle for the Kingdom by 3LV Games (2003)
 Heat Project by Doobic (2003)
 Wolfteam by Softnyx (2007)
 Repulse by Aeria Games (2012)

References

1998 software
Game engines for Linux
Video game engines
Monolith Productions